The Logothetopoulos apartment building is located at Bouboulinas street in Athens. It was designed by architect Kyprianos Biris for the famous medical doctor and the late prime minister of Greece Konstantinos Logothetopoulos.

History 

The foundation stone was laid in 1930 and the building was completed in 1932. It originally included 46 apartments distributed over four floors. It is considered to be an early example of modern architecture. 

From the mid 1950s until mid 1970s the building was used as the headquarters of Central Intelligence Service. During the military junta political prisoners were tortured by officers in the cells and on the roof making it notorious in collective memory. In 1980 Communist Party of Greece (KKE) bought the building and sold it in 1993 to the Greek state. Since then the Ministry of Culture has been located there.

See also
Modern architecture in Athens

References  	

Buildings and structures in Athens